Marine Department is a term for a variety of departments, in marine science, military and maritime transport and authorities:

Government bodies and authorities
Department of Marine and Fisheries and the Naval Service, Canada
Department of Marine and Fisheries, Canada
Department of Agriculture, Food and the Marine, Ireland
Marine Department (Hong Kong) - manages the Hong Kong harbour

Marine Department (Malaysia), a federal agency in Malaysia
Marine Department (New Zealand)
Marine Fisheries Department, Pakistan
Singapore Marine Department, now merged into the Maritime and Port Authority of Singapore

Military organisations
Marine Department (Royal Navy), British Admiralty
State Department Marines, USA